Yule Brook College  is a public co-educational middle day school, located on Dellar Road in Maddington, a suburb of Perth, Western Australia.

Overview 
The college was initially established in 1978 as Maddington Senior High School, and renamed as Yule Brook College in 2000. It caters for students from Year 7 to Year 10. 
 
The school's creation was a result of government restructuring education facilities in the south east metropolitan corridor. Two new middle schools, Yule Brook and Cannington Community College, were opened in 2000 and 2001 respectively. A new senior campus, Sevenoaks Senior College for Year 11 and 12 was also opened in the old Cannington Senior High School site.

Enrolments at the school have been reasonably stable with around 250 students when Year 7 started intake at the school in 2015. Yule Brook College uses the Big Picture Education design, which focuses on "one student at a time".

See also

 List of schools in the Perth metropolitan area

References

External links 

Public high schools in Perth, Western Australia
1978 establishments in Australia
Educational institutions established in 1978